Clavascidium is a genus of lichens in the family Verrucariaceae. The genus was circumscribed in 1996 by Austrian lichenologist Othmar Breuss. Because the type species of the genus, Clavascidium umbrinum, has been shown using molecular phylogenetics to belong to genus Placidium, Cécile Gueidan and colleagues proposed to unite Clavascidium with Placidium in a 2009 publication. Despite this, the genus has been retained in recent publications of fungal classification.

Species
Clavascidium antillarum 
Clavascidium imitans 
Clavascidium kisovense 
Clavascidium krylovianum 
Clavascidium lacinulatum 
Clavascidium pseudorufescens 
Clavascidium semaforonense 
Clavascidium sinense  – China

A couple of species once proposed for inclusion in this genus are now classified in other genera:
Clavascidium liratum  is now Anthracocarpon virescens
Clavascidium umbrinum  is now Placidium umbrinum.

A proposed generic transfer of Catapyrenium alvarense  to Clavascidium in 2017 was invalidly published according to nomenclatural rules.

References

Eurotiomycetes genera
Lichen genera
Verrucariales